In Style was a Holsteiner gelding ridden by Canadian Equestrian Team member Ian Millar in the sport of show jumping. He was imported to Canada from the Netherlands in 2003. His full brother, VDL Atlantic, is also an international show jumper. Furthermore, VDL Atlantic was a Zangersheide-approved stallion with approved sons of his own. The dam of In Style and Atlantic is Diana, a full sister to Lord Z, himself a strong sire and FEI show jumper under Franke Sloothaak and John Whitaker.
In Style was reported to be a sensitive horse with a Thoroughbred-like disposition.

In Style was best known for representing Canada on the international scene. He and Ian Millar were members of silver medal teams at both the 2007 Rio de Janeiro Pan American Games and the 2008 Beijing Olympic Games.

Pedigree

References 

Show jumping horses
Horses in the Olympics
1995 animal births
2015 animal deaths
Olympic silver medalists for Canada
Individual male horses
Holsteiner horses